The Skeleton was a free independent monthly newspaper published in Chicago, Illinois between 2006 and 2008. It was started by Chicago underground writer Liam Warfield in Pilsen. The compact newspaper released its first issue, #00, on October 27, 2006. Its first anniversary issue was released in October 2007 under a theme of "Failure" and in Fall of 2008, the paper released its final issue under the theme of "Success". Archived by both The Chicago Underground Library and The Chicago Public Library, the paper has been characterized as a small but notable press, having acquired celebrity interviews with academics and artists such as Loren Coleman and Patti Smith while declining from online content and non-local advertising.

References 

Defunct newspapers published in Chicago
Publications established in 2006